The 1942 Marshall Thundering Herd football team was an American football team that represented Marshall University as an independent during the 1942 college football season. In its eighth season under head coach Cam Henderson, the team compiled a 1–7–1 record and was outscored by a total of 118 to 52. Sam Clagg and Paul McCuskey were the team captains.

Schedule

References

Marshall
Marshall Thundering Herd football seasons
Marshall Thundering Herd football